is a Japanese mixed martial artist. He fought for the Tokyo Sabres in the International Fight League.

Career
Hamanaka began his mixed martial arts career in 2003 with a victory over Antonio Schembri at PRIDE 26.  After losing to Ryan Gracie in PRIDE Bushido 1, he made stints in other organizations such as K-1.  Over his mixed martial arts career, Hamanaka has trained with IFL coaches Matt Lindland and Dan Henderson, as well as UFC legend Randy Couture. Kazuhiro currently resides in Tokyo.

Mixed martial arts record

|-
| Loss
| align=center| 5–7–1
| Shunsuke Inoue
| TKO (punches)
| Pancrase: Changing Tour 6
| 
| align=center| 1
| align=center| 0:52
| Tokyo, Japan
| 
|-
| Win
| align=center| 5–6–1
| Alavutdin Gadjiev
| DQ (illegal knee)
| GCM - Cage Force & Valkyrie
| 
| align=center| 3
| align=center| 1:04
| Tokyo, Japan
| 
|-
| Loss
| align=center| 4–6–1
| Karl Amoussou
| KO (flying knee)
| M-1 Challenge 14: Japan
| 
| align=center| 1
| align=center| 0:23
| Tokyo, Japan
| 
|-
| Loss
| align=center| 4–5–1
| Matt Horwich
| KO (head kick)
| IFL-Everett
| 
| align=center| 1
| align=center| 2:07
| Everett, Washington, United States
| 
|-
| Loss
| align=center| 4–4–1
| Jeremy Williams
| TKO (triangle choke)
| IFL-Los Angeles
| 
| align=center| 1
| align=center| 0:59
| Los Angeles, California, United States
| 
|-
| Loss
| align=center| 4–3–1
| Alex Schoenauer
| Submission (guillotine choke)
| IFL-Portland
| 
| align=center| 1
| align=center| 1:04
| Portland, Oregon, United States
| 
|-
| Win
| align=center| 4–2–1
| Yoichi Babaguchi
| Submission (kimura)
| Hero's 5
| 
| align=center| 1
| align=center| 1:22
| Tokyo, Japan
| 
|-
| Win
| align=center| 3–2–1
| Wesley Correira
| Submission (kimura)
| ROTR 9-Rumble on the Rock 9
| 
| align=center| 2
| align=center| 1:53
| Honolulu, Hawaii, United States
| 
|-
| Loss
| align=center| 2–2–1
| Wilson Gouveia
| TKO (punches)
| Euphoria-USA vs. Japan
| 
| align=center| 1
| align=center| 0:39
| Atlantic City, New Jersey, United States
| 
|-
| Draw
| align=center| 2–1–1
| Yukiya Naito
| Draw
| GCM-D.O.G. 3
| 
| align=center| 2
| align=center| 5:00
| Tokyo, Japan
| 
|-
| Win
| align=center| 2–1
| Webster Dauphiney
| KO
| NJPW-Los Angeles Dojo Show
| 
| align=center| 2
| align=center| 0:40
| Los Angeles, California, United States
| 
|-
| Loss
| align=center| 1–1
| Ryan Gracie
| TKO (soccer kicks)
| PRIDE Bushido 1
| 
| align=center| 1
| align=center| 7:37
| Saitama, Japan
| 
|-
| Win
| align=center| 1–0
| Nino Schembri
| Decision (unanimous)
| PRIDE 26
| 
| align=center| 3
| align=center| 5:00
| Yokohama, Japan
|

References

External links

Kazuhiro Hamanaka IFL Page
International Fight League

Living people
1978 births
Japanese male mixed martial artists
Middleweight mixed martial artists
Mixed martial artists utilizing wrestling
Japanese male sport wrestlers
Amateur wrestlers
Sportspeople from Tokyo
Nippon Sport Science University alumni